The Central Leading Group for Taiwan Affairs is an internal policy coordination group of the Central Committee of the Chinese Communist Party and the State Council of the People's Republic of China, reporting to the Politburo of the Chinese Communist Party, in charge of supervising and coordinating Beijing's policy towards Taiwan, including developing cross-strait relations. It was established in 1979 and has been led by the General Secretary of the Chinese Communist Party since 1989.

List of Leaders 
 Deng Yingchao (1979–1987)
 Yang Shangkun (1987–1989)
 Jiang Zemin (1989–2004)
 Hu Jintao (2004–2012)
 Xi Jinping (2012–present)

Current composition 
 Leader
 Xi Jinping, General Secretary of the Chinese Communist Party, President of the People's Republic of China

 Deputy Leader
 Wang Yang, Chairman of the Chinese People's Political Consultative Conference

 Chief of General Office' Song Tao

 Secretary-General
 Yang Jiechi

 Members
 Unknown''

References

See also 

 Taiwan Affairs Office
 Central Coordination Group for Hong Kong and Macau Affairs

Politburo of the Chinese Communist Party
Leading groups of the Chinese Communist Party
Cross-Strait relations